The 2012-2013 MRF Challenge Formula 2000 Championship was the inaugural running of the MRF Challenge Formula 2000 Championship. The series consisted of 10 races, spread across 3 meetings began on 26 October 2012 at the Buddh International Circuit, supporting the 2012 Indian Grand Prix and ended on 10 February 2013.

Drivers

Race calendar and results

All rounds were held in India.

Championship standings

Scoring system

References

Further reading 
 , MRF Limited. Retrieved on 21 January 2014.
 , MRF Limited, Delhi, 28 October 2012. Retrieved on 21 January 2014.
 , MRF Limited, Delhi, 30 November 2012. Retrieved on 21 January 2014.
 , MRF Limited, Delhi, 29 November 2012. Retrieved on 21 January 2014.
 , Madras Motor Sports Club, Chennai, 10 February 2013. Retrieved on 21 January 2014.
 Setna, Johann., Johann Setna, 6 March 2013. Retrieved on 21 January 2014.
 Setna, Johann., Johann Setna, 15 July 2013. Retrieved on 21 January 2014.

External links 

 

2012-2013
MRF Challenge
MRF Challenge
MRF Challenge
MRF Challenge